Gunnar Beck is a German politician, academic and lawyer. He is Member of the European Parliament (MEP) for the Alternative for Germany (AfD) party and currently hold the position of deputy leader of the AfD in the European Parliament and Vice-President of the Identity & Democracy Group. He previously was, and currently remains, a reader in law at the SOAS, University of London.

Academic career 
Gunnar Beck read philosophy, politics and law in Oxford and London. Beck completed his doctorate in political and legal philosophy under the supervision of Professor Sir Isaiah Berlin in 1996 at Nuffield College, Oxford. He qualified as a barrister of the Inner Temple in 2000 and subsequently worked for the international law firm Herbert Smith and as Deputy Legal Adviser (EU law) at the House of Commons of the United Kingdom Parliament. He currently combines academic work with legal practice as a lawyer specialising in EU law. He is a specialist in EU law and has taught the subject at SOAS, University of London since 2005. He previously taught EU law, political philosophy and international relations at Oxford University and the LSE.

Publications 
In his 2013 study entitled The Legal Reasoning of the Court of Justice of the EU Beck argues that The ECJ was established at the same time as the EU (then the European Economic Community) to settle disputes between the EU’s institutions and its member states and to provide authoritative guidance on the interpretation of the EU Treaties and EU legislation. He claims that it has never discharged that function impartially. He says, the Court has drawn inspiration from its integrationist vision of ‘"ever closer union" between the EU’s members, the Court has used the purposive approach consistently to resolve legal disputes concerning the distribution of powers between the EU and members in a pro-integrationist manner. He concluded the Court has repeatedly the scope of EU law without reference to the Treaties. and established its own judicial oversight over many areas of national law. It has usually done so in the absence of Treaty authority and not infrequently in a departure from clear language in the Treaties or EU legislation. As a result, the scope of EU law is incrementally expanding from one judicial decision to the next.

Political career 
Beck was a candidate of the German party Alternative für Deutschland for the European Parliamentary Election of 2019. On 2 July 2019 he was elected to the European Parliament. He is a member of the Parliament's Identity and Democracy Group. He is also a member of the Working Group on the Conference on the Future of Europe.

He is also a member of other EU Parliamentary committees: Committee on Economic and Monetary Affairs ECON; Committee on Legal Affairs; Delegation to the EU-Russia Parliamentary Cooperation Committee, and is a substitute member on the Committee on Constitutional Affairs and the Subcommittee on Tax Matters.

In April 2021 he called for Ursula von der Leyen, President of the European Commission, to resign over the "disastrous" EU Covid vaccine roll-out. He said "von der Leyen was a disastrous minister in Germany, and has proved the same now as Commission President."

Academic title dispute 
Prior to the European Parliament election, it was reported that Beck was listed on the ballot paper as holding a professorship, even though he holds the less senior rank of reader at SOAS. The German Bundeswahlleiter, however, has confirmed that Beck was not responsible for the information on the ballot paper, as he simply entered his first name and his surname without any titles. Accordingly, Beck explained that he had merely translated his British university title and defended his actions as "legally unobjectionable and correct in content." Yet, according to the Ministry of Science and Culture of North Rhine-Westphalia, which is governed by the ruling CDU in coalition with the FDP Liberal Party, the "simple conversion of a British university position into a German title" may not be lawful in Germany even if it is a correct translation of the equivalent professional position of a person.

Works 
 Beck, Gunnar (2013). The Legal Reasoning of the Court of Justice of the EU. Oxford: Hart Publishing.
 Beck, Gunnar (2008). Fichte and Kant on Freedom, Rights and Law. Lexington Books.

References

External links 

"The Lisbon Treaty & the EU Charter of Fundamental Rights: How they will change the EU". (Institute of Advanced Legal Studies Speaker Series, London, England)
Website of The School of Oriental and African Studies (SOAS), London

European Union law scholars
21st-century German lawyers
Living people
Alumni of Nuffield College, Oxford
MEPs for Germany 2019–2024
Academics of SOAS University of London
1966 births
Alternative for Germany MEPs